Musician Johnny Marr, formerly with The Smiths, The The, Electronic, Modest Mouse and The Cribs and now playing solo, has appeared as a guest musician on the recordings of numerous other musicians. Sometimes he has appeared as a songwriter only and not a guest musician with some of the musicians listed below.

Everything But The Girl
 Everything but the Girl (1984)

Billy Bragg
 Talking with the Taxman About Poetry (1986)
 Don't Try This at Home (1991)
 Bloke on Bloke (1997)
 Reaching to the Converted (1999)

Bryan Ferry
 Bête Noire (1987)
 Avonmore (2014)

Talking Heads
 Naked (1988)

Sandie Shaw
 Hello Angel (1988)

Kirsty MacColl
 Kite (1989)
 Electric Landlady (1991)
 Titanic Days (1993)

The Pretenders
 Packed! (1990)

Pet Shop Boys
 Behaviour (1990)
 Bilingual (1996)
 Release (2002)
 Yes (2009)

Banderas
 Ripe (1991)

Moodswings
 Moodfood (1992)
 Horizontal (2002)

Stex
 Spiritual Dance (1992)

K-Klass
 Universal (1993)

Electrafixion
 Burned (1995)

M People
 Fresco (1997)

Marion
 The Program (1998)

Beck
 Midnite Vultures (1999)

Tom Jones
 Reload (1999)

The Cult
 Rare Cult (2000)

Bert Jansch
 Crimson Moon (2000)
 On The Edge Of A Dream (2017)
 At The BBC (2022)

Twenty Four Hours
 This Is Urbanite.Co.Uk (2001)

Oasis
 Heathen Chemistry (2002)

Beth Orton
 Daybreaker (2002)

The Charlatans
 Live It Like You Love It (2002)
 Different Days (2017)

Pearl Jam
 Feb 23 03#10 Perth (2003)

Quando Quango
 Pigs + Battleships (2003)

Lisa Germano
 Lullaby for Liquid Pig (2003)
 In the Maybe World (2006)

Tweaker
 2 a.m. Wakeup Call (2004)

Haven
 All for a Reason (2004)

Jane Birkin
 Fictions (2006)

Transit Kings
 Living in a Giant Candle Winking at God (2006)

Crowded House
 Time On Earth (2007)

Girls Aloud
 Out of Control (2008)

John Frusciante
 The Empyrean (2009)

Robyn Hitchcock
 Propellor Time (2010)
 Shufflemania (2022)

Edwyn Collins
 Losing Sleep (2010)

Hans Zimmer
 Inception: Music from the Motion Picture (2010)
 The Amazing Spider-Man 2: The Original Motion Picture Soundtrack (2014)
 Freeheld Soundtrack (2015)
 Live In Prague (2017)
 No Time to Die: Original Motion Picture Soundtrack (2021)

Pajama Club
 Pajama Club (2011)

Malka Spigel
 Every Day Is Like the First Day (2012)

Andrew Loog Oldham
 Rolling Stones Songbook Vol. 2 (2013)

Tim Wheeler
 Lost Domain (2014)

Noel Gallagher's High Flying Birds
 Chasing Yesterday (2015)
 Who Built the Moon? (2017)
 Council Skies (2023)

Chris Spedding
 Joyland (2015)

Blondie
 Pollinator (2017)

A Certain Ratio
 ACR:BOX (2019)

Drake
 Care Package (2019)

The Avalanches
 We Will Always Love You (2020)

Jake Bugg
 Jake Bugg (2022)

Rock music discographies
Discographies of British artists